Matthew Handcock  (1658-1740) was an 18th-century Anglican priest in Ireland.

The son of William Handcock, an MP in the Irish House of Commons,  he educated at Trinity College, Dublin.  He was Archdeacon of Kilmore from 1699 until his death.

References

18th-century Irish Anglican priests
Archdeacons of Kilmore
1658 births
1740 deaths
Alumni of Trinity College Dublin